The 1988 La Flèche Wallonne was the 52nd edition of La Flèche Wallonne cycle race and was held on 13 April 1988. The race started in Spa and finished in Huy. The race was won by Rolf Gölz of the Superconfex team.

General classification

References

1988 in road cycling
1988
1988 in Belgian sport